For Me It's You is the fifth studio album by the Canadian country music singer Michelle Wright. It was released on August 27, 1996, on Arista Nashville. Two tracks, "We've Tried Everything Else" and "Cold Kisses", were reprised from Wright's 1994 album, The Reasons Why. Raul Malo, the lead singer of the country music group The Mavericks, sings backup on the track "Love Has No Pride".

Track listing
 "Nobody's Girl" (Gretchen Peters) - 3:19
 "The Answer Is Yes" (Rodney Crowell) - 3:41
 "We've Tried Everything Else" (Pam Tillis, Bob DiPiero, Steve Seskin) - 3:53
 "I'm Not Afraid" (Dougie Pincock, Monty Powell, Debi Cochran, Anna Wilson) - 3:12
 "What Love Looks Like" (Michelle Wright, Christi Dannemiller, Lisa Drew) - 3:18
 "You Owe Me" (Craig Wiseman, Ronnie Samoset) - 3:28
 "For Me It's You" (Marilyn Martin, Trey Bruce, Thom McHugh) - 3:19
 "Cold Kisses" (Tillis, Chapin Hartford) - 4:05
 "Crank My Tractor" (Steven Dale Jones, Mark Narmore) - 3:02
 "Love Has No Pride" (Eric Kaz, Libby Titus) - 3:57

Personnel

Brian Barnett - drums
Richard Bennett - electric guitar
Michael Black - background vocals
Mark Casstevens - acoustic guitar, mandolin
Joe Chemay - bass guitar
John Cowan - background vocals
Bill Cuomo - synthesizer
Dan Dugmore - steel guitar
Tabitha Fair - background vocals
Michael Francis - acoustic guitar, electric guitar
Larry Franklin - fiddle
Paul Franklin - dobro, steel guitar, pedabro
Michael Freeman - bass guitar, background vocals
John Gardner - drums
Sonny Garrish - dobro, steel guitar
Steve Gibson - electric guitar
Rick Gratton - drums
Tony Harrell - keyboards
John Hobbs - organ, piano
Dann Huff - electric guitar
Sheree Jeacocke - background vocals
John Johnson - baritone saxophone, tenor saxophone
Paul Leim - drums, percussion
Pasi Leppikangas - drums
Sara Majors - acoustic guitar, mandolin, background vocals
Raul Malo - background vocals on "Love Has No Pride"
Liana Manis - background vocals
The Nashville String Machine - strings
Steve Nathan - keyboards
Don Nielson - background vocals
Michael Omartian - piano
Kim Parent - background vocals
Lou Pomanto - accordion, piano
Monty Powell - background vocals
Mark Prentice - bass guitar
Kip Raines - background vocals
Buck Reid - steel guitar
Michael Rhodes - bass guitar
Tom Roady - percussion
Matt Rollings - keyboards
Jim Scherer - acoustic guitar, electric guitar
Mike Severs - electric guitar
Eric Silver - fiddle, acoustic guitar, electric guitar, mandolin
Tom Szczesniak - bass guitar
Billy Thomas - drums
Lee Warren - dobro, steel guitar
Biff Watson - acoustic guitar
John Willis - acoustic guitar
Dennis Wilson - background vocals
Michelle Wright - lead vocals

Chart performance

1996 albums
Michelle Wright albums
Arista Records albums
Albums produced by Val Garay